Anthony is an unincorporated community in Hamilton Township, Delaware County, Indiana.

History
A post office was established at Anthony in 1850, and remained in operation until it was discontinued in 1901. It was likely named in honor of the Anthony family of pioneer settlers.

Geography

References

Unincorporated communities in Delaware County, Indiana
Unincorporated communities in Indiana